Sharpe's Gold is a 1995 British television drama, the sixth of a series screened on the ITV network that follows the career of Richard Sharpe, a British soldier during the Napoleonic Wars. The drama has almost nothing in common with the novel of the same name by Bernard Cornwell. Scriptwriter Nigel Kneale explained, "I didn't use much of [the book]. I used the first ten pages, I think. Then I had an idea which would be more fun to do. It was all about magic by the time I was through with it."

Plot summary
It is summer 1813. Lord Wellington (Hugh Fraser) is preparing to invade France from Spain after winning the campaign on the Iberian peninsula.

Meanwhile, Major Richard Sharpe (Sean Bean) gets into serious trouble when he tries unsuccessfully to save one of his riflemen, Skillicorn (Philip Dowd), from being executed by the zealous Lieutenant Ayres (Ian Shaw) for stealing a chicken. To maintain discipline in his army, Wellington makes Sharpe apologise to Ayres.

Bess Nugent (Rosaleen Linehan) and her daughter Ellie (Jayne Ashbourne), arrive unannounced from Ireland to visit their cousin, Wellington. They are there to search for Bess's husband, Will (Peter Eyre). Wellington refuses to assist their foolhardy mission, demanding they go home. Sharpe and Ellie find themselves attracted to each other, and they engage in a friendly shooting match at 100 yards. Several of the officers and men place bets on the contest; surprisingly Sharpe only narrowly prevails.

Wellington assigns Sharpe the task of handing over 50 rifles in exchange for some British deserters caught by a feared Spanish guerrilla leader named El Casco (Abel Folk). The Provost Marshal insists that some of his men go along, so Sharpe is saddled with Ayres. Later, the two ladies catch up to Sharpe's detachment, forcing him to take them along for their protection. On the way, they repel an attack by French cavalry led by Lieutenant Barbier (Julian Sims). Ellie becomes distraught after having to shoot and kill a young Frenchman. When Sharpe tries to comfort her away from the others, they embrace.

The trade goes as planned. However, Ellie then discovers that one of the deserters has her father's pipe. When Sharpe refuses to begin a search, the Nugents ride off, forcing Sharpe to go after them. The riflemen spot Barbier's detachment and drive them off with a surprise attack.

The ladies encounter El Casco's men; Bess is killed and Ellie taken captive. When she is taken to El Casco's cave lair, she finds her father, though he has become deranged. Sharpe tracks them down with the help of Barbier, whose men were captured and had their hearts cut out while still alive by the partisans (who believe they are descendants of shipwrecked Aztecs). Sharpe attacks the Spaniards and rescues Ellie and her father. El Casco kills Ayres and wounds Sharpe, but is killed by Sergeant Harper (Daragh O'Malley). Back at camp, Will recovers his senses and thanks Sharpe.

Cast
 Sean Bean as Richard Sharpe
 Daragh O'Malley as Sergeant Patrick Harper
 Hugh Fraser as Lord Wellington
 Hugh Ross as Major Mungo Munro
 Michael Mears as Rifleman Francis Cooper
 John Tams as Rifleman Daniel Hagman
 Jason Salkey as Rifleman Harris
 Lyndon Davies as Rifleman Perkins
 Rosaleen Linehan as Bess Nugent 
 Jayne Ashbourne as Ellie Nugent 
 Peter Eyre as Will Nugent
 Abel Folk as El Casco 
 Philip McGough as Provost Marshal 
 Ian Shaw as Lieutenant Ayres 
 Julian Sims as Lieutenant Barbier 
 Diana Perez as Ramona 
 Philip Dowd as Rifleman Skillicorn 
 Peter-Hugo Daly as Sergeant Rodd 
 Nicholas McGaughey as Tripper 
 Jake Abraham as Donkin 
 Jonathan McGuinness as Bewley

Production
According to Jason Salkey, who played Rifleman Harris, the episode was originally cast with different actors, and had to be re-scripted to avoid paying this original cast as well. This is one reason it differs greatly from the book, and is not thought highly of by lead actor Sean Bean.

References

External links
 
 Sharpe's Gold at SharpeFilm.com

1995 British television episodes
1990s historical films
1990s war films
Napoleonic Wars films
Gold
War television films
Fiction set in 1813
Films directed by Tom Clegg (director)